Piroska is a Hungarian feminine given name. Derived from the Latin name Prisca ("ancient"), the Hungarian form of the name originally appeared as Piriska, later developing into Piroska. This change was likely due to Piriska's similarity to the Hungarian name — and color — Piros ('red').

The name is on the official list of Hungarian names managed by the Research Institute for Linguistics of the Hungarian Academy of Sciences. Its diminutive form, or nickname, Piri, has developed into a standalone name.

The name day for Piroska and Piri is January 18.

Notable Piroskas and Piris
 Piroska Molnár, Hungarian actress
 Piroska Szamoránsky, handball player
 Saint Piroska, renamed Irene, daughter of King László I, wife of John II Komnenos
 Piri Vaszary, actress

The name Piroska in popular culture
 Piroska Rozgonyi in János Arany's narrative poem Toldi szerelme
 Hungarian name for Little Red Riding Hood

See also
 Priscilla, whose Hungarian form is Priszcilla

References

Hungarian feminine given names

de:Piroschka
sr:Присцила (име)